Rudniki may refer to:

Rudniki, Gdańsk, a district of the city of Gdańsk, Poland
Rudniki, Greater Poland Voivodeship (west-central Poland)
Rudniki, Łęczyca County in Łódź Voivodeship (central Poland)
Rudniki, Poddębice County in Łódź Voivodeship (central Poland)
Rudniki, Lublin Voivodeship (east Poland)
Rudniki, Sokołów County in Masovian Voivodeship (east-central Poland)
Rudniki, Wołomin County in Masovian Voivodeship (east-central Poland)
Rudniki, Opole Voivodeship (south-west Poland)
Rudniki, Białystok County in Podlaskie Voivodeship (north-east Poland)
Rudniki, Suwałki County in Podlaskie Voivodeship (north-east Poland)
Rudniki, Bytów County in Pomeranian Voivodeship (north Poland)
Rudniki, Człuchów County in Pomeranian Voivodeship (north Poland)
Rudniki, Kwidzyn County in Pomeranian Voivodeship (north Poland)
Rudniki, Gmina Koniecpol in Silesian Voivodeship (south Poland)
Rudniki, Gmina Rędziny in Silesian Voivodeship (south Poland)
Rudniki, Zawiercie County in Silesian Voivodeship (south Poland)
Rudniki, Kielce County in Świętokrzyskie Voivodeship (south-central Poland)
Rudniki, Opatów County in Świętokrzyskie Voivodeship (south-central Poland)
Rudniki, Staszów County in Świętokrzyskie Voivodeship (south-central Poland)
Rudniki, Warmian-Masurian Voivodeship (north Poland)
Rudniki, West Pomeranian Voivodeship (north-west Poland)